Jawahar Navodaya Vidyalaya, Kozhikode or locally known as JNV Calicut is a boarding, co-educational school in Kozhikode district of Kerala state in India. Navodaya Vidyalayas are funded by the Indian Ministry of Human Resources Development and administered  by Navodaya Vidyalaya Smiti, an autonomous body under the ministry. Previously the school name was JNV Calicut before renaming of Calicut district to Kozhikode district.

History 
The school was established in 1987–88, and is a part of Jawahar Navodaya Vidyalaya schools. This school's permanent campus is located at village Palayad Nada, Kozhikode district. This school is administered and monitored by Hyderabad regional office of Navodaya Vidyalaya Smiti.

Admission 
Admission to JNV Kozhikode at class VI level is made through selection test conducted by Navodaya Vidyalaya Smiti. The information about test is disseminated and advertised in the district by the office of Kozhikode district magistrate (Collector), who is also the chairperson of Vidyalya Management Committee.

Affiliations 
JNV Kozhikode is affiliated to Central Board of Secondary Education with affiliation number 940001, following the curriculum prescribed by CBSE.

See also 

 List of JNV schools
 List of Kendriya Vidyalayas
 Odisha Adarsha Vidyalaya - Emulation of the Navodaya Vidyalaya system

References

External links 

 Official Website of JNV Kozhikode
 JNV Kozhikode

High schools and secondary schools in Kerala
Kozhikode
Educational institutions established in 1987
1987 establishments in Kerala
Kozhikode district